The Little Lucille is a relatively recently designed (1996-2006) Gibson model designed mainly for blues players. It superficially resembles the Les Paul in that the body outline is similar. The Little Lucille was discontinued by Gibson in 2006. The Little Lucille is a variant on the Blueshawk that features a stop tailpiece and tune-o-matic bridge. The Little Lucille was endorsed by BB King

Construction
The Little Lucille has a number of distinctive features that distinguish it from virtually all other Gibsons. The Little Lucilles body outline is the same as a slightly earlier range of guitars - the Nighthawks (1993-1999) - but unlike the Nighthawks, the Little Lucille is a semi-hollow bodied guitar with twin f-holes and a flat (uncarved) top.Other distinctive / innovative features include:'''

 25.5 inch scale length (the same as many Fenders, Gibson's more typically have a 24.75 inch scale length)
 Blues 90 pickups (a modified version of the P-90 pickup)
 noise reduction circuitry which employs a dummy coil
 a Varitone circuit (similar to that used on the Gibson ES345) - the Varitone circuit is a mid-cut/band-stop filter with a choice of five center frequencies
 a light guitar - the body is made from poplar, capped with maple - the body is small and relatively thin and has two cavities
 simple control set - master volume, master tone, three-way pickup selector, six-way rotary Varitone control switch

Notes

External links
 Blueshawk.info - an independent enthusiast site dedicated to the Gibson Blueshawk, the Little Lucille'' and the other Hawk guitars
 Review of the Gibson Little Lucille. Lucille Has A Little Sister. (Jun 21st 2001).

Little Lucille